Robert Claflin Rusack (16 June 1926 – 16 July 1986) was the fourth bishop of Los Angeles in the Episcopal Church from 1974 until his death in 1986. He was succeeded by Frederick Borsch.

Early life and education
Rusack was born on June 16, 1926, in Worcester, Massachusetts, to Roy Leonard Rusack and Dorothy Claflin. In 1947 he graduated with a B.A. from Hobart College. He also earned his Doctor of Divinity from the same college in 1970. He was a scholar at St Augustine's College, Canterbury in England between 1957 and 1958 and graduated with a Doctor of Sacred Theology from General Theological Seminary in 1965.

Priest
In 1951 Rusack was ordained priest and was subsequently appointed vicar of  St James's Church in Deer Lodge, Montana. In 1955 he resigned to study in England. Upon his return he became rector of St Augustine By-The-Sea Church in Santa Monica, California. Whilst there he was also responsible of the day school in his parish and also the parochial mission of St Aidan in Malibu, California.

Bishop
On June 10, 1964, Rusack was elected Suffragan Bishop of Los Angeles. In 1969 he was elected Bishop of Dallas; however, he declined. He was elected Coadjutor Bishop of Los Angeles in 1972 on the first ballot. He succeeded as diocesan bishop on January 1, 1974. During his time as bishop he supported the ordination of women to the priesthood. He also supported the establishment of missions to new immigrants in Los Angeles. He was also involved in a number of lawsuits aiming to retain church properties which were taken over by congregations who left the Episcopal Church. Rusack took the decision to demolish St Paul's Cathedral in Los Angeles, which suffered extensive damage in an earthquake. Rusack died on July 16, 1986, as a result of a heart attack in Pacific Palisades, Los Angeles.

Personal life
Rusack married Janice Overfield of Salt Lake City on June 26, 1951. They had 2 children.

References

External links 
 New York Times reports his death

1926 births
1986 deaths
Hobart and William Smith Colleges alumni
20th-century American Episcopalians
Episcopal bishops of Los Angeles
20th-century American clergy